Petro Ruci (3 March 1957 – 2 July 2009) was an Albanian football defender.

Club career
Ruci had a spell at Dinamo Tirana and was part of Flamurtari's golden team of the mid-1980s who played Spanish giants FC Barcelona in two successive UEFA Cup seasons.

International career
He made his debut for Albania in a September 1982 European Championship qualification match against Austria and earned a total of 8 caps, scoring no goals. His final international was a November 1983 European Championship qualification match against West Germany.

Death
Ruci died of a long illness in July 2009 in Athens, Greece, where he was scouting youth players.

Honours
Albanian Cup: 2
 1985, 1988

References

External links

1957 births
2009 deaths
Footballers from Vlorë
Albanian footballers
Association football defenders
Albania international footballers
FK Dinamo Tirana players
Flamurtari Vlorë players
Kategoria Superiore players